Power meter may refer to:

 Electricity meter measures electrical energy (electrical power supplied to a residence, business or machine over time)
 Wattmeter measures the electrical power circulating in any electric circuit
 Microwave power meter measures power in a microwave signal
 Optical power meter measures power in an optical signal
 Google PowerMeter is a tool to track a household's energy usage
 A cycling power meter measures the power output of a bicycle rider
 Health meter, a video game mechanic